Jon Miller (born November 14, 1956) is an American television executive for NBC Sports, a division of NBCUniversal.  He joined NBC in 1978, and was named President of Sports Programming in 2011.  He is responsible for the creation of the NHL Winter Classic and The National Dog Show among many other events.  During his tenure, he has worked with every major sports league in the US.

Early life 
Miller was born in Washington DC, but grew up in Bethesda, Maryland.  He attended Walt Whitman High School and subsequently earned his bachelor's degree in business administration from Miami University in Oxford, Ohio.

Career

Early days 
Miller started worked as an account executive for WRC-TV in Washington DC in October 1978. While at WRC, he created the George Michael Sports Final, the precursor to the legendary George Michael Sports Machine.  After moving to New York to sell national advertising for the NBC Stations Group, he soon joined the NBC Sports & Olympics Sales department.  In 1988, he was promoted to Vice President of Programming, Planning & Development for NBC Sports.

Programming 
Miller worked for many years under the leadership of Dick Ebersol.  Shortly after joining the programming team, NBC lost the rights to Major League Baseball for the first time in 40 years. To help fill the void, Miller created the NBC Sports Ventures unit which aimed to create events that NBC use to generate non-traditional streams of income.  Events he has created include:

 NHL Winter Classic
 American Century Championship
 Father/Son Challenge 
 National Heads-Up Poker Championship
 National Dog Show
 Collegiate Rugby Championship

In his time at NBC Sports, Miller has been instrumental in acquiring and programming some of the world's top sports properties including the NHL, Notre Dame Football, the French Open, horse racing's Triple Crown, NFL on NBC, MLB, Wimbledon, Premier League, Formula One, NASCAR, The Indianapolis 500, Tour de France, NBA, US Open Golf, PGA Tour, Ryder Cup, Presidents Cup, Rugby World Cup and America's Cup. In 2020, Miller led the team that brought the US Open back to NBC after five years on Fox.
Starting in 2021, Miller played in integral role in two important NBC Sports rights deals that combined for $5.15B in just under a year.  First, in November 2021, he led the team that renewed the Premier League rights for another six years through the year 2028 for more than $2.7B.   Following that, in August 2022, Miller agreed to a rights deal with the Big Ten Conference that runs from 2023 to 2030 and will launch a new football brand for the league.  Big Ten Saturday Night is planned to air every Saturday night on NBC starting with the 2023 Football Season.  This deal worth $2.45B ended the Big Ten/ABC relationship that dated back to 1966.

References 

Living people
1956 births
People from Washington, D.C.
Miami University alumni
American television executives
NBC executives
Presidents of NBC Sports
Walt Whitman High School (Maryland) alumni